The Rousettinae are a subfamily of megabats. Taxa within this subfamily include:

 Tribe Eonycterini
Genus Eonycteris
 Greater nectar bat, E. major
 Cave nectar bat, E. spelaea
 Philippine dawn bat, E. robusta
tribe Epomophorini
Genus Epomophorus
 Angolan epauletted fruit bat, E. angolensis
 Ansell's epauletted fruit bat, E. anselli
 Peters's epauletted fruit bat, E. crypturus
 Dobson's epauletted fruit bat, E. dobsonii
 Gambian epauletted fruit bat, E. gambianus
 Lesser Angolan epauletted fruit bat, E. grandis
 Ethiopian epauletted fruit bat, E. labiatus
 East African epauletted fruit bat, E. minimus
 Minor epauletted fruit bat, E. minor
 Wahlberg's epauletted fruit bat, E. wahlbergi
Genus Epomops
 Buettikofer's epauletted fruit bat, E. buettikoferi
 Franquet's epauletted fruit bat, E. franqueti
 Genus Hypsignathus
Hammer-headed bat, H. monstrosus
Genus Micropteropus
 Hayman's dwarf epauletted fruit bat, M. intermedius
 Peters's dwarf epauletted fruit bat, M. pusillus
Genus Nanonycteris
Veldkamp's dwarf epauletted fruit bat, N. veldkampii
tribe Myonycterini
 Genus Megaloglossus
Azagnyi fruit bat, M. azagnyi
Woermann's bat, M. woermanni
 Genus Myonycteris
 São Tomé collared fruit bat, M. brachycephala
 East African little collared fruit bat, M. relicta
 Little collared fruit bat, M. torquata
Tribe Plerotini
Genus Plerotes
D'Anchieta's fruit bat, P. anchietae
Tribe Rousettini
Genus Rousettus – rousette fruit bats
Genus Rousettus
Manado fruit bat, R. bidens
 Geoffrey's rousette, R. amplexicaudatus
 Egyptian rousette, R. aegyptiacus
 Leschenault's rousette, R. leschenaulti
 Linduan rousette, R. linduensis
 Comoro rousette, R. obliviosis
 Bare-backed rousette, R. spinalatus
 Madagascan rousette, R. madagascariensis
Tribe incertae sedis
Genus Pilonycteris
Sulawesi rousette, P. celebensis
Tribe Scotonycterini
Genus Casinycteris
 Short-palated fruit bat, C. argynnis
 Campo-Ma’an fruit bat, C. campomaanensis
 Pohle's fruit bat, C. ophiodon
Genus Scotonycteris
Zenker's fruit bat, S. zenkeri
Tribe Stenonycterini
Genus Stenonycteris
Long-haired fruit bat, S. lanosis

References

Megabats
Mammal subfamilies